Frazier is an unincorporated community in Greenbrier County, West Virginia, United States. Attractions include the Greenbrier River and the nearby Greenbrier River Campground.

References

Unincorporated communities in Greenbrier County, West Virginia
Unincorporated communities in West Virginia